Mohan Charan Majhi is an Indian politician. He was elected to the Odisha Legislative Assembly from Keonjhar (Odisha Vidhan Sabha constituency) in the 2019 Odisha Legislative Assembly election as a member of the Bharatiya Janata Party. He also represented the Keonjhar twice during the years 2000 to 2009.

References

1972 births
Living people
People from Kendujhar district
Bharatiya Janata Party politicians from Odisha
Odisha MLAs 2019–2024